The orange-breasted falcon (Falco deiroleucus) is a Near Threatened bird of prey in the family Falconidae, the falcons and caracaras. It is found in southern Mexico, Belize, Guatemala, Panama, and either definitely or probably in every South American country except Chile and Uruguay.

Taxonomy and systematics

The orange-breasted falcon and the bat falcon (F. rufigularis) share plumage and vocal characteristics and may be sister species. Those two appear to be closely related to the aplomado falcon (F. femoralis).

The orange-breasted falcon is monotypic.

Description

Of all the falcons, this species has the greatest difference in size between the sexes. It is a rather husky, large-headed, bird. The sexes have similar plumage, and the species resembles the smaller bat falcon. Adults have a black head and bluish black upperparts with paler blue-gray edge on the feathers. Their throat and sides of the neck are white and their upper breast is buffy rufous orange that also extends onto the sides of the neck. The ratio of white to orange varies among individuals. Their lower breast is black with coarse reddish brown bars, somewhat lighter on the flanks. Their belly, thighs, and undertail coverts are the same buffy rufous orange as the upper breast. Their cere, the bare skin around the eye, and their legs and feet are usually bright yellow, but may be pale yellow to dull bluish green. Their iris is dark brown. Immatures are paler and less sharply marked than adults. Their back and tail are dark brownish, their underparts mostly pale buffy with dark brown barring on the breast. Their bare parts are dull bluish green that become more yellow with age.

Distribution and habitat

The orange-breasted falcon formerly was found from southern Mexico all the way to northern Argentina. Its range is now much reduced. The only fairly recent records in Middle America are from Belize, Guatemala, and Panama, though it might still be present in southern Mexico. It is extremely rare or extirpateed in Costa Rica, Nicaragua, and Honduras. There are no records in El Salvador. The species is present though rare in Brazil, Ecuador, Peru, and Venezuela. Its status is uncertain in Bolivia, Colombia, Guyana, Paraguay, Suriname, and Trinidad and Tobago. Specimens exist from all of this last list of countries, and most are believed to have a few resident pairs. Except in a very few locations it is very sparsely distributed. Knowledge of its distribution is clouded by the species' resemblance to the much more widespread and populous bat falcon.

The orange-breasted falcon is dependent of tropical rain- and semi-deciduous forest with cliffs for nesting. It favors uninterrupted mature forest but also occurs in a mosaic landscape of forest and more open areas.

Predation

Black-and-white hawk-eagles (Spizaetus melanoleucus) and stygian owls (Asio stygius) are known predators of the orange-breasted falcon in Belize. Black vultures (Coragyps atratus) occcur throughout Middle and South America. Their effect on the orange-breasted falcon appears to be through usurpation of nest sites. Falcon breeding success in a Guatemalan study was much greater at nests protected from Black Vultures. Africanized bees colonize the same type of cliffs as the falcons; no direct effects have been documented but the bees are known to affect other bird species.
There is a camera trap record of a vampire bat (Desmodontinae sp.) feeding on an incubating female orange-breasted falcon.

Behavior

Movement

Orange-breasted falcon pairs occupy their territories year-round. Young disperse when independent but the distance typically traveled is not known.

Feeding

The orange-breasted falcon preys on a very wide variety of birds and also bats. Forty-five species of birds, of 22 families, have been documented as prey in Belize and Guatemala. It usually hunts above the forest canopy, either by diving from a cliff or dead treetop or by stooping from great height. "It also uses a stealth strategy for capturing migrating songbirds, shorebirds, and bats, by silhouetting them against the sky at dusk and dawn."

Breeding

The orange-breasted falcon's nest is a scrape or depression, usually on a cliff ledge or pothole, though a pair has nested on a temple in Guatemala's Tikal National Park. There are also a few records of nesting in detritus caught in the crotch of a large emergent tree. The clutch size is usually three eggs but can be two or four. The incubation period is about 30 to 34 days and fledging occurs about 40 to 45 days after hatch. The female does most of the incubating and provisioning of nestlings. The time to independence after fledging is not known.

Bathing

An orange-breasted falcon purposely crashed into leaves of trees with water gathered on them, apparently as a form of bathing.

Vocalization

Both sexes of the orange-breasted falcon are highly vocal when breeding. Their aggresive defense call is "a rapid-fire key-key-key-key...repeated over and over until the threat subsides". The call has also been described as "kyowh-kyowh-kyowh". Pairs utter soft chirps or piping sounds as part of courtship.

Status

The IUCN has assessed the orange-breasted falcon as Near Threatened. Though it nominally has a large range, the species is sparsely distributed in it. Its population size is not known and is believed to be decreasing. Clearing of forest for timber, agriculture, and ranching is the principal threat. Black vultures and Africanized bees are known or suspected to affect nesting success.  

The Peregrine Fund captive breeds orange-breasted falcons. Since 2007 the organization has bred and released 56 falcons into the wild in Belize. As of 2013, 23 had become independent and some have paired with wild bred birds and entered the local breeding population.

References

External links

Stamp photo (for Bolivia)

orange-breasted falcon
Birds of Mexico
Birds of Central America
Birds of South America
Birds of the Amazon Basin
Birds of Brazil
Birds of the Guianas
Birds of Bolivia
Birds of Paraguay
orange-breasted falcon